The Lonely, the Lonesome & the Gone is the ninth studio album by the American country music singer-songwriter Lee Ann Womack. It was released on October 27, 2017, by ATO Records. It was available to stream a week before on NPR.org as part of its First Listen series.

The album was nominated for Best Americana Album and Best American Roots Song for "All the Trouble" at the 61st Annual Grammy Awards.

Background
Speaking about the album, Womack said, "I wanted to get out of Nashville, and tap the deep music and vibe of East Texas. I wanted to make sure this record had a lot of soul in it, because real country music has soul. I wanted to remind people of that." "All the Trouble", which was written by Womack, Waylon Payne and Adam Wright, is the lead single from the album. The album consists of 14 songs.

"Take the Devil Out of Me" is a cover version of a George Jones song. "Long Black Veil" is a cover version of a Lefty Frizzell's song which was also notably recorded by Johnny Cash.

Commercial performance
The album debuted at No. 37 on the Billboard Top Country Albums chart, selling 3,200 copies in the first week. It had sold 10,100 copies in the US up to March 2018.

Track listing

Personnel
Musicians
 Ethan Ballinger - guitar, kayagum, vocals
 Shawn Camp - backing vocals
 Christina Courtin - strings
 Glen Duncan - fiddle
 Paul Franklin - steel guitar
 Annalise Liddell - guitar, backing vocals
 Frank Liddell - guitar, vocals
 Waylon Payne - guitar
 Jerry Roe - bass, drums
 Glenn Worf - bass, drums
 Adam Wright - keyboards, tremolo guitar
Other credits
 Rob Carmichael - design
 Gavin Lurssen - mastering
 Mike McCarthy - recording, mixing
 Eric Masse - editing
 Ebru Yildiz - photography

Reception 
Brittney McKenna of NPR wrote that the album "has a cinematic quality to it, one buoyed by both lush, dynamic arrangements and by a skillfully executed sequence."  Metacritic gives the album a score of 77, based upon seven critics that provided generally favorable reviews.

Charts

References

2017 albums
Albums produced by Frank Liddell
ATO Records albums
Lee Ann Womack albums